Papianilla (born 415) was a Roman noblewoman.

She was the wife of Tonantius Ferreolus. Another Papianilla, the wife of the poet Sidonius Apollinaris, was a relative of hers.

She had Tonantius Ferreolus and other sons.

Notes

Sources
 "Papianilla 1", Prosopography of the Later Roman Empire, Volume 2, p. 830.

5th-century Roman women
415 births
Year of death unknown